The cliff flycatcher (Hirundinea ferruginea) is a species of bird in the tyrant flycatcher family, Tyrannidae. The cliff flycatcher is the only species in the genus Hirundinea after the swallow flycatcher was merged, becoming subspecies Hirundinea ferruginea bellicosa. It is native to South America, where its natural habitats are cliffs and crags in the vicinity of subtropical or tropical dry forest, subtropical or tropical moist lowland forest, subtropical or tropical moist montane forest, and heavily degraded former forest.

Taxonomy
The cliff flycatcher was formally described in 1788 by the German naturalist Johann Friedrich Gmelin in his revised and expanded edition of Carl Linnaeus's Systema Naturae. He placed it with the todies in the genus Todus and coined the binomial name Todus ferrugineus. Gmelin based his description on the "ferruginous bellied tody" from Cayenne that had been described in 1782 by the English ornithologist John Latham in his book A General Synopsis of Birds. Latham had access to a specimen in the Leverian Museum in London. The cliff flycatcher is now the only species placed in the genus Hirundinea that was introduced in 1837 by the French naturalists Alcide d'Orbigny and Frédéric de Lafresnaye to accommodate Tyrannus bellicosus Vieillot, which is now considered a subspecies of the cliff flycatcher. The genus name Hirundinea is Latin meaning "of swallows": the specific epithet ferruginea is Latin meaning "rusty-coloured" or "ferruginous".

Four subspecies are recognised:
 H. f. ferruginea (Gmelin, JF, 1788) – east Colombia, northwest Brazil, southeast Venezuela, southwest Guyana and French Guiana
 H. f. sclateri Reinhardt, 1870 – west Venezuela, Colombia to southeast Peru
 H. f. bellicosa (Vieillot, 1819) – south, east Brazil, east Paraguay, northeast Argentina and Uruguay
 H. f. pallidior Hartert, EJO & Goodson, 1917 – north, east Bolivia, west Paraguay and northwest Argentina

Description

It has a wide beak and long pointed wings, resembling those of a swallow. The upper parts are dusky brown, with a distinctive rufous rump and base of tail. The tips of the wing feathers are dark, but the remaining parts are cinnamon-rufous and these are exposed in flight. The underparts are pale cinnamon-rufous, with some grey speckling on the throat.

Distribution and habitat
The cliff flycatcher is only found east of the Andes cordillera, and therefore is not found in Chile. All other countries in South America are represented in its range. In the Amazon basin, it surrounds the basin in the foothills, and highest elevations at tributaries' headwaters; it ranges down to central Argentina west of the Pampas, and east of the Pampas to southern Brazil, Paraguay and Uruguay; also southeast of the Amazon Basin in the Brazilian Highlands, to the Atlantic and south Atlantic coast of Brazil, about an  stretch of coastline. Its natural habitat is in the vicinity of cliffs and gorges, canyons, rocky outcrops, quarries and road cuttings. It is also found, particularly in the south of its range, around buildings in cities, where the windowsills and facades provide a form of artificial cliff. Southerly populations are migratory while more northerly ones are sedentary.

Ecology
The cliff flycatcher perches in a prominent position, sallying to hawk for insects in spectacular aerial flying displays. It nests on cliff ledges, stabilising the nest by arranging pebbles in a ring to support the structure. In the city environment of São Paulo, it breeds on the windowsills of high rise blocks.

References

External links

Cliff flycatcher videos on the Internet Bird Collection
Photo-Medium Res; Article John Kormendy: Birds of Brazil - University of Texas Astronomy
Cliff flycatcher photo gallery VIREO (Visual Resources for Ornithology)

cliff flycatcher
Birds of the Northern Andes
Birds of Colombia
Birds of Venezuela
Birds of the Guianas
cliff flycatcher
cliff flycatcher
Taxonomy articles created by Polbot